Madge Easton Anderson (24 April 1896 – 1982) was a Scottish lawyer. She was the first woman admitted to practise as a professional lawyer in the UK when, in 1920, she qualified as a solicitor in Scotland.

Life 
Anderson was born on 24 April 1896 in Glasgow to Anne Catherine Chisholm (1864–1947), daughter of an Inverness bookseller, and Robert Easton Anderson (1865-1932), a surgical instrument maker.

From 1904 to 1913 she attended Hutcheson's Grammar School, going on to study at the University of Glasgow. She graduated with an MA in 1916, a BL in 1919 and an LLB in 1920. She was the first woman to graduate from the University with a degree in law. She was not however the first female law graduate in Scotland: Eveline MacLaren and Josephine Gordon Stuart graduated from the Faculty of Law at the University of Edinburgh some years earlier, but at that time women were prohibited from practising as lawyers.
 
On 12 May 1917 she began working as an apprentice law agent at the practice of Maclay Murray & Spens. In 1920, Anderson was the first woman to be admitted to the legal profession in the United Kingdom following the passing of the Sex Disqualification (Removal) Act 1919, when she was admitted as a law agent in Scotland (the Scottish Law Agents Society was formed in 1884; the Law Society of Scotland was not created until 1949).

Her application for admission as a law agent was initially refused, because the necessary three years of training began before the passing of the Act, and her indenture of training was not properly registered — registration was refused in 1917 because she was a woman. She appealed to the Court of Session, and her petition was reported to the Inner House, First Division, and heard in December 1920, by the Lord President, Lord Mackenzie, Lord Skerrington and Lord Cullen. The opinion of the Lord Ordinary Lord Ashmore criticised the English terminology used in the Act, but concluded that she was entitled to have her petition granted, and the court upheld her appeal.

In 1922 Anderson was working at the Glasgow law firm John Steuart and Gillies, where she stayed for five years before establishing her own practice in Giffnock in Glasgow.  She was articled in London, with legal partners Edith Annie Berthen and Beatrice Honour Davy. They had established the first legal firm run by women in 1931.
 In 1937 she became the first woman qualified to practice as a solicitor in both England and Scotland, after passing the English Law Society final exam. She then joined Berthen and Davy as a partner in the expanded law firm.

In 1949 she purchased a house near Dunkeld in Perthshire which she ran as a private hotel for some years, before moving first to a cottage near Crieff and then to Bankfoot. However, the details of her later life remain obscure.  Anderson died at the Royal Infirmary, Perth, on 9 August 1982.

She is honoured with a blue plaque at the Stair Building, University of Glasgow’s School of Law.

See also
 Margaret Kidd DBE, KC, the first woman to be called to the Scottish Bar, in July 1923

References

Notes
 Put her on a pedestal, The Scotsman, 7 March 2004
 Women in the World's Legal Professions, Ulrike Schultz, Gisela Shaw, p. 141

1896 births
1982 deaths
Lawyers from Glasgow
Alumni of the University of Glasgow
Scottish solicitors
Scottish women lawyers
20th-century women lawyers